Bertola is a surname. Notable people with the surname include:

Adrianna Bertola (born 1999), English actress and singer
Catherine Bertola (born 1976), British artist
Ignazio Bertola, Italian military architect
Jean Bertola (1922–1989), French musician
Mariana Bertola (1865–1955), American educator, physician and reformer

See also
46392 Bertola, a main-belt asteroid